Lésignac-Durand is a commune in the Charente department in the Nouvelle-Aquitaine region in southwestern France.

Geography
The commune is found within the Rochechouart impact structure.

Population

Personalities
 Antoine Thomas, Sieur de Lézignac, adviser to the king holding the Présidial seat of Angoumois.
 The Thomas family members were aldermen, mayors of Angoulême, and advisers to the Présidial of Angoulême in the seventeenth century. The family was ennobled in 1639, 1667 and 1736.

See also
Communes of the Charente department

References

Communes of Charente